The 12th Southeast Asia Basketball Association Championship was the qualifying tournament for the 2017 FIBA Asia Cup. It also served as a regional championship involving Southeast Asian basketball teams. It was held from 12 to 18 May 2017 in the Philippines.

Originally scheduled to be held from 23 to 30 April 2017, SEABA decided to postpone the tournament to 15 to 21 May 2017 due to conflicting schedule with the ASEAN Basketball League and the Indonesian Basketball League. For the first time, this tournament only allotted one spot for the subzone for the renamed continental championship which was held in Lebanon from 10 to 20 August 2017.

The SEABA U16 Championship for Men was also hosted by the Philippines from 14 to 18 May 2017 at the same venue.

Host selection
The defending champions, through the Samahang Basketbol ng Pilipinas (SBP), was awarded the hosting rights of the championship. This was the first time that the Philippines hosted the SEABA Championship since 2001. The country signified its interest to host the 2017 tournament sometime in December 2016, before the December 31 deadline set by SEABA.

Teams
(NR) - Not ranked

Venue
Smart Araneta Coliseum in Quezon City was the main venue of the weeklong tournament.

Officials

Commissioners
  Wong Chung Min
  Daniel Danilo Soria
  Hector Villanueva

Referees
The following referees were selected for the tournament.

  Yuen Chun Yip
  Harja Jaladri
  Rendra Lesmana
  Chan Kin Pong
  Chu Wei Chuen
  Ting Pick Kieng
  Linn Maung
  Arnolfo Bermeo
  Ferdinand Pascual
  Joenard García
  Michael Tolentino
  Ricor Buarón
  Leong Chuen Wing
  Chuang Chih-Chun
  Yu Jung
  Nattapong Jontapa
  Samphan Kamphusiriphan

Results

Statistical leaders

Players

Points

Rebounds

Assists

Steals

Blocks

Other statistical leaders

Teams

Points

Rebounds

Assists

Steals

Blocks

Other statistical leaders

Final standings

Awards

Notes

References 

2017
International basketball competitions hosted by the Philippines
2017–18 in Philippine basketball
2017–18 in Asian basketball
May 2017 sports events in the Philippines
Sport in Quezon City